Mind How You Go is a mini-album by Cate Brooks, under the pseudonym of The Advisory Circle. The album was released on 17 October 2005 on the Ghost Box Music label. It was re-released in  2009 with two extra tracks and renamed Mind How You Go Now.

Track listing

First release

Re-release

External links
 Stylus Magazine review
 Ghost Box Music page

The Advisory Circle albums
Ghost Box Music albums
2005 albums